Neobathiea, abbreviated as Nbth in the horticultural trade, is a genus of  orchids (family Orchidaceae), native to tropical moist broadleaf forests of  Madagascar and the Comoro Islands. The genus is named for the French botanist Henri Perrier de la Bâthie.

The species include small, monopodial epiphytes, with relatively large white, green, or green-and-white flowers with a long spur at the base of the lip.

Pollination
Pollination occurs through hawkmoths. The separation of species is upheld by flower constancy of pollinators.

Synonyms 
Neobathiea filicornu Schltr is a synonym of Neobathiea grandidierana (Rchb.f.) Garay
Neobathiea gracilis Schltr and Neobathiea sambiranoensis Schltr are synonyms of Aeranthes schlechteri Bosser.

References

External links 
 
 

 
Vandeae genera
Epiphytic orchids